Thomas Francis Gunning (March 4, 1862 – March 17, 1931) was a professional baseball catcher and umpire. He played six seasons in the major leagues, from 1884 until 1889. Gunning umpired 44 major league games during the 1890 season. After his baseball career, Gunning worked as a physician and medical examiner.

Playing career
Gunning began his professional baseball career in 1883 in the Northwestern League, playing for the team representing Springfield, Illinois. In 1884, he played for the Boston Reserves of the Massachusetts State Association.

Gunning's major league career spanned 1884 to 1889, with three different teams. From 1884 through 1886, he played for the Boston Beaneaters of the National League. He appeared in a total of 87 games with Boston, recording a .186 batting average with 24 RBIs. In April 1887, the Beaneaters sold Gunning's contract to the Philadelphia Quakers of the National League. He batting .260 with 16 RBIs and one home run in 28 games during 1887, his one season with the Quakers. In 1888, Gunning was released by the Quakers and signed by the Philadelphia Athletics of the American Association.. He played for the Athletics during 1888 and 1889, appearing in 31 games while batting .207 with six RBIs and one home run. The Athletics released Gunning on June 29, 1889.

Overall, Gunning appeared in 146 major league games, compiling a career .205 batting average with 46 RBIs and two home runs. All of his defensive appearances were at catcher, playing a maximum of 48 games in a season, which he recorded with the 1885 Boston Beaneaters. He had a career .887 fielding average. In his final two major league seasons, Gunning served as backup to Wilbert Robinson of the Athletics, who later managed the Brooklyn Robins from 1914 through 1931 and was inducted to the Baseball Hall of Fame in 1945.

Late in his career, Gunning played in the Atlantic Association in 1889 for the team representing Hartford, Connecticut.

Umpiring career

During his time as a player, Gunning served as umpire in 10 major league games; these were all games that his team was playing in. In this era, reserve players were sometimes called upon to officiate games due to the absence of scheduled umpires, caused by illness, injury, or travel issues. Following his playing career, Gunning umpired 44 games (30 at first base, 14 at home plate) in the Players' League during 1890, from mid-April to mid-June.

Personal life
Gunning was born in Newmarket, New Hampshire, in 1862. He graduated from the University of Pennsylvania Medical School in 1891, and later served as city physician and medical examiner for Fall River, Massachusetts. He died in Fall River in 1931 and is interred in the North End Burial Ground there. He was survived by his wife, Ida Gunning née Corcoran (d. 1951), and a son, Reverend Thomas C. Gunning (1899–1947) of Taunton, Massachusetts.

Notes

References

External links

1862 births
1931 deaths
Major League Baseball catchers
Boston Beaneaters players
Philadelphia Quakers players
Philadelphia Athletics (AA) players
Boston Reserves players
Springfield, Illinois (minor league baseball) players
Hartford (minor league baseball) players
Baseball players from New Hampshire
People from Newmarket, New Hampshire
19th-century baseball players
19th-century baseball umpires
Perelman School of Medicine at the University of Pennsylvania alumni
Physicians from New Hampshire
Medical examiners
Sportspeople from Rockingham County, New Hampshire